Nothria is a genus of polychaetes belonging to the family Onuphidae.

The genus has cosmopolitan distribution.

Species:

Nothria abyssia 
Nothria africana 
Nothria anoculata

References

Polychaetes